North Cape, Northern Cape, or Nordkapp may refer to:

Places
Nordkapp, a municipality in northern Norway
Nordkapp (Bjørnøya), the northernmost point of Bear island in Arctic Norway
Nordkapp (Jan Mayen), the northernmost point of Jan Mayen island, Norway
Nordkapp (Nordaustlandet), the northernmost point of Nordaustlandet island in the Svalbard archipelago, Norway
North Cape (Norway), a cape at the northernmost part of Magerøya island in Finnmark county, Norway
North Cape (Prince Edward Island), a cape at the northwesternmost extremity of Prince Edward Island, Canada
North Cape (New Zealand), a cape at the northern end of the North Auckland Peninsula in the North Island, New Zealand
Noordkaap (Netherlands), the northernmost point of mainland Netherlands
North Cape, Wisconsin, an unincorporated community in Racine County, Wisconsin, United States
North Cape, South Australia, a locality on Kangaroo Island in Australia
The North Cape, a fictional location in J. R. R. Tolkien's writings associated with Middle-earth

Ships
HNoMS Nordcap, 1840 ship of the Royal Norwegian Navy
HNoMS Nordkapp, 1937 ship of the Royal Norwegian Navy
NoCGV Nordkapp (1964) of the Royal Norwegian Navy and later Coast Guard
Nordkapp-class offshore patrol vessel, 1980 class of the Norwegian Coast Guard
NoCGV Nordkapp (1980) lead vessel of said class
MS Nordkapp, 1996 cruiseferry of the Norwegian Coastal Express (Hurtigruten)
North Cape oil spill, a barge which ran aground in Rhode Island, United States, in 1996, causing a major environmental incident

Other
Battle of the North Cape, a Second World War naval battle
Capo Nord (album), a 1980 album by Alice

See also
 Cabo Norte, Cabo do Norte, or Cape de Nord, the northernwestern point of the Amazon delta
 Cabo Norte, a captaincy of the former Viceroyalty of Brazil
 Northern Cape, a province of South Africa
 Cape North (disambiguation)